The Westland Wallace was a British two-seat, general-purpose biplane of the Royal Air Force, developed by Westland as a follow-on to their successful Wapiti. As the last of the interwar general purpose biplanes, it was used by a number of frontline and Auxiliary Air Force Squadrons. Although the pace of aeronautical development caused its rapid replacement in frontline service, its useful life was extended into the Second World War with many being converted into target tugs and wireless trainers. In 1933 a Westland Wallace became the first aircraft to fly over Everest, as part of the Houston-Mount Everest Flight Expedition.

Design and development
In 1931, Westland produced the PV-6, a private-venture development of its successful Wapiti. This updated aircraft embodied a number of improvements including a lengthened fuselage, brakes and wheel spats on the undercarriage and a new engine. By this time both the appearance and performance differed considerably from the standard Wapiti, so the company designated it the "PV6 Wallace." Compared with the earlier Wapiti, the Wallace was  longer, incorporated an improved undercarriage and was powered by a  Bristol Pegasus IV engine. The first batches of MK I Wallaces were conversions of Wapitis, a total of 68 powered by  Pegasus IIM3 engines.

Westland designed an improved version, the Mk II which was fitted with a more powerful engine and the then-novel idea of an enclosed canopy over both crew positions. This offered greater comfort for the crew and improved the rear gunner's aim by protecting him from the slipstream. Three Wallace Is (K4346-K4348) were later converted to Mk II standards, including fitting the closed canopy.

Operational history 

The original PV-6 prototype, registered G-ACBR (and also known as the Houston-Wallace) along with Westland PV-3 G-ACAZ, was part of the Houston Everest Expedition, named after Lucy, Lady Houston the patron, an attempt to fly over Mount Everest. Both aircraft received modifications that included fitting heating and oxygen equipment, fully enclosing the rear cockpits and using highly supercharged Bristol Pegasus IS 3 engines. Flown by Flight Lieutenant D.F. McIntyre and Douglas Douglas-Hamilton, 14th Duke of Hamilton, otherwise known as Lord Clydesdale, the two aircraft became the first to fly over Mount Everest on 3 April 1933.

Most of the Wallaces served with the Auxiliary Air Force: 501, 502, 503 and 504 squadrons beginning with the converted Wapitis early in 1933. Others operated with the Anti-Aircraft Cooperation Flight at RAF Biggin Hill. The last Wallace was completed in October 1936.

The first RAF casualties of WW2 occurred when a Wallace of the RAF Observer School (K6028) crashed at Bennachie, near Aberdeen. Pilot Officer Ellard Alexander Cummings (23) from Ottawa, Canada and Leading Aircraftman Alexander Ronald Renfrew Stewart (24) both lost their lives.

When withdrawn from the general purpose role, many Wallaces were converted into target tugs. A total of 83 Wallaces remained in service at the beginning of the Second World War. The last were withdrawn in 1943.

Variants
Westland PV-6Prototype, later converted to military configuration as a Wallace I.
Houston-Wallace Alternative name for the PV-6 as modified for the Everest expedition.
Wallace Mk IConversion from Wapiti powered by a  Bristol Pegasus IIM3 engine, 68 converted.
Wallace Mk IINew aircraft with glazed cockpit and powered by a  Bristol Pegasus IV engine, 104 built.

Operators

 
 Royal Air Force
 No. 501 Squadron RAF
 No. 502 Squadron RAF
 No. 503 Squadron RAF
 No. 504 Squadron RAF

Specifications (Westland Wallace II)

See also

References 
Notes

Bibliography

 James, Derek N. Westland Aircraft since 1915. London: Putnam Aeronautical Books, 1991. .
 James, Derek. "To The Top of the World". Aeroplane. Vol. 36, No. 4, Issue No 420, April 2008, pp. 20–25. 
 Mondey, David. The Hamlyn Concise Guide to British Aircraft of World War II. London: Aerospace Publishing, 1994. .
 Thetford, O. Aircraft of the Royal Air Force 1918-57. London: Putnam, 1957.

External links 

 Westland Wallace Mk II

1930s British military utility aircraft
Wallace
Single-engined tractor aircraft
Biplanes
Aircraft first flown in 1931